Outside the Skyline is the third studio album by songwriter and music producer Miguel Migs, released September 20, 2011 on Om Records. Outside the Skyline features vocal performances by Migs's main vocalist, Lisa Shaw, as well as Aya, disco legend Evelyn "Champagne" King, reggae artists Capleton, Half Pint and Freddie McGregor, with Meshell Ndegeocello, Berlin-based singer Georg Levin, and bossa nova artist Bebel Gilberto. The first single, "Everybody", featuring Evelyn "Champagne" King, was released on 19 July 2011.

Track listing

References

2011 albums
Miguel Migs albums
Om Records albums